The McCalmont Cup is a greyhound racing competition held annually at Kilkenny Greyhound Stadium at St. James' Park, Kilkenny, Ireland.

The competition is a feature competition in the Irish racing calendar organised by the Irish Greyhound Board.

The event was won by three times Irish Greyhound Derby champion Spanish Battleship in 1954 & 1955  and the competition was known as the Red Mills Stake & Kilkenny Cup from 1994-2005.

Past winners

Venues & Distances 
1947–present (Kilkenny 525y)

Sponsors
1999–2005 (Red Mills)
2006–2008 (Kilford Hotel)
2009–2012 (Broadway Pet Foods)
2013–2013 (Kilford Arms Hotel)
2014–present (Frightful Flash Kennels)

References

Greyhound racing competitions in Ireland
Sport in County Kilkenny
Recurring sporting events established in 1947